The 1884 Victorian Football Association season was the eighth season of the Australian rules football competition. The premiership was won by the Geelong Football Club. It was the club's sixth VFA premiership in just seven seasons, and was the third in a sequence of three consecutive premierships won from 1882 to 1884.

Association membership 

The senior metropolitan membership of the Association (including Geelong) increased from six to eight clubs in 1884. The two new clubs were the Williamstown Football Club, which was elevated from junior status; and the newly established Fitzroy Football Club.

At this time, three other provincial senior clubs were full Association members represented on the Board of Management: Ballarat, South Ballarat (formerly known as Albion Imperial) and Horsham Unions. Due to distance, these clubs played too few matches against the rest of the VFA to be considered relevant in the premiership.

1884 VFA premiership 
The 1884 premiership was won by the Geelong Football Club, which won twenty-two and drew one of its twenty-five matches.  finished second with sixteen wins and two draws from twenty-four matches; Hotham finished third.

Club senior records 
The below table details the playing records of the eight clubs in all matches during the 1884 season. Two sets of results are given:
 Senior results: based only upon games played against other VFA senior clubs
 Total results: including senior games, and games against intercolonial, up-country and junior clubs.

The clubs are listed in the order in which they were ranked in the Sportsman newspaper. The VFA had no formal process by which the clubs were ranked, so the below order should be considered indicative only, particularly since the fixturing of matches was not standardised; however, the top three placings were later acknowledged in publications including the Football Record and are considered official.

External links 
 Victorian Football Association/Victorian Football League History (1877-2008)
 List of VFA/VFL Premiers (1877-2007)
 History of Australian rules football in Victoria (1853-1900)

References 

Victorian Football League seasons
Vfa Season, 1884